The 2012 PBZ Zagreb Indoors was an ATP men's tennis tournament played on hard courts indoors. It was the 7th edition of the PBZ Zagreb Indoors, and was part of the ATP World Tour 250 series of the 2012 ATP World Tour. It took place in Zagreb, Croatia from January 28 through February 5, 2012. Mikhail Youzhny won the singles title.

Singles main-draw entrants

Seeds

 Rankings are as of January 16, 2012

Other entrants
The following players received wildcards into the singles main draw:
  Dino Marcan
  Kristijan Mesaroš
  Antonio Veić

The following players received entry from the qualifying draw:
  Marco Chiudinelli
  Daniel Evans
  Jürgen Melzer
  Matteo Viola

Doubles main-draw entrants

Seeds

 Rankings are as of January 16, 2012

Other entrants
The following pairs received wildcards into the doubles main draw:
  Ivan Dodig /  Mate Pavić
  Marin Draganja /  Franco Škugor

Finals

Singles

 Mikhail Youzhny defeated  Lukáš Lacko, 6–2, 6–3
 It was Youzhny's 1st title of the year and 8th of his career.

Doubles

 Marcos Baghdatis /  Mikhail Youzhny defeated  Ivan Dodig /  Mate Pavić, 6–2, 6–2

External links
 ATP tournament profile
 Official website

Zagreb Indoors
PBZ Zagreb Indoors
PBZ Zagreb Indoors
2010s in Zagreb